This is the results breakdown of the local elections held in Catalonia on 26 May 2019. The following tables show detailed results in the autonomous community's most populous municipalities, sorted alphabetically.

Opinion polls

City control
The following table lists party control in the most populous municipalities, including provincial capitals (shown in bold). Gains for a party are displayed with the cell's background shaded in that party's colour.

Municipalities

Badalona
Population: 217,741

Barcelona

Population: 1,620,343

Cornellà de Llobregat
Population: 87,173

Girona
Population: 100,266

L'Hospitalet de Llobregat
Population: 261,068

Lleida
Population: 137,856

Mataró
Population: 126,988

Reus
Population: 103,477

Sabadell
Population: 211,734

Sant Cugat del Vallès
Population: 90,664

Santa Coloma de Gramenet
Population: 118,821

Tarragona
Population: 132,299

Terrassa
Population: 218,535

References

Catalonia
2019